Transitions Optical is a U.S.-based company known for manufacturing photochromic lenses. The company was founded in 1990.

In 1991, Transitions Optical became the first company to commercialize and manufacture plastic photochromic lenses.  From inception the company has been a joint venture between PPG Industries (51%) and Essilor (49%). In April 2014, Essilor acquired the entire stake of PPG in Transitions.

From 2009 to 2012, Transitions Optical was the title sponsor of the Transitions Championship, a PGA Tour event held at Innisbrook Resort and Golf Club in Palm Harbor, Florida. The firm was the Official Eyewear of the PGA Tour, Champions Tour and Nationwide Tour. It also sponsors pro cycling Team Garmin-Cervelo.

References

External links

Essilor
PPG Industries
American companies established in 1990
Manufacturing companies established in 1990
Eyewear brands of the United States
Eyewear companies of the United States
Joint ventures
1990 establishments in Florida